Jules Pierre Rambur (21 July 1801 – 10 August 1870) was a French entomologist.

Rambur was born in Chinon. He studied the insect fauna of Corsica and Andalusia. He was the author of Histoire naturelle des insectes (1842) amongst other works. He died in Geneva.

He was a Member and later (1839) President of the Société entomologique de France.

Publications
Catalogue des lépidoptères insectes Néuroptères de l’île de Corse (1832)
Faune entomologique de l’Andalousie (two volumes, 1837–1840)
Histoire naturelle des insectes( part of the Suites à Buffon, 1842)Catalogue systématique des Lépidoptères de l’Andalousie (1858–1866).
with Adolphe Hercule de Graslin and Jean Baptiste Boisduval Collection iconographique et historique des chenilles; ou, Description et figures des chenilles d'Europe, avec l'histoire de leurs métamorphoses, et des applications à l'agriculture Paris,Librairie encyclopédique de Roret,1832.

Sources
Jean Gouillard (2004). Histoire des entomologistes français, 1750–1950. Édition entièrement revue et augmentée. Boubée (Paris), 287 p. 
 (1987). Les Entomologistes français. 1750–1950''. INRA Éditions.

External link

French lepidopterists
 01
1801 births
1870 deaths
French taxonomists
19th-century French zoologists
Presidents of the Société entomologique de France
People from Chinon
Deaths in Switzerland